Dorcus rectus, the little stag beetle, is a species of beetles in the family Lucanidae. It can be found in China(Liaoning), Korea, Japan, Taiwan and Russia. These beetles have a distinctive red shell that separates them from Dorcus curvidens. Males of this species have been observed to have mandible trimorphism, a characteristic that has only been described in two species of Lucanidae—with the other one being Odontolabis cuvera—"and a small number of other invertebrates" as of 2017. The mandibles are used by males as weapons.

References 

Lucaninae
Beetles of Asia
Insects of Japan
Taxa named by Victor Motschulsky
Beetles described in 1857